Mark Hanna was an American industrialist and politician.

Mark Hanna may also refer to:

Mark Hanna (screenwriter) (1917–2003), film screenwriter and actor
A defendant who was acquitted in R v Coulson, Brooks and others

See also
Mark Hanna Crouter (1897–1942), U.S. Navy officer and Navy Cross recipient
Marcus Hanna (lighthouse keeper) (1842–1921), Medal of Honor recipient and lighthouse keeper